Ormond Dale McGill (June 15, 1913 – October 19, 2005) was a stage hypnotist, magician and instructor who was considered to be the "Dean of American Hypnotists". He was also a writer and author of many books including Hypnotism and  Mysticism of India (1979) and The New Encyclopedia of Stage Hypnotism.

Early life and career
He wrote the seminal Encyclopedia of Genuine Stage Hypnotism (the acknowledged bible of stage hypnotism) in 1947, and continued to teach courses and lecture right up until a few days before his death. He died in his native Palo Alto. 

From 1947 to 1954, McGill performed hypnotism and magic under the stage name of Dr. Zomb. His "Séance of Wonders" show featured horror-themed routines and costumed assistants typical of the midnight "spook shows" which were popular during that era. He has performed in several stage shows all over the globe in the 20th century. Ormond McGill also trained students for therapeutic applications through hypnotism.

McGill continued to collaborate with other colleagues including Gil Boyne, whom he mentored, and to teach hypnotherapy until his death in 2005 with Randal Churchill at the Hypnotherapy Training Institute.

Other Attributes
In addition to his career as a world-traveling magician and stage hypnotist, McGill was also a skilled hypnotherapist and a student of Eastern mysticism.  He wrote between twenty-five and forty books (sources disagree on the total), including such titles as Grieve No More Beloved (about his afterlife contact with his deceased wife), Hypnotism and Mysticism of India, and his autobiography, The Amazing Life of Ormond McGill. McGill has revealed the truth behind magical events such as the Indian rope trick and others during his visit to India .

References

External links
Ormond McGill's Bio at Hypnotherapy Training Institute
Ormond McGill Memorial Site
San Francisco Chronicle obituary  (SFGate through Legacy.com)
 (originally http://www.durbinhypnosis.com/mcgill.htm)

1913 births
2005 deaths
American hypnotists
American magicians
American male non-fiction writers
American spiritual mediums
American occult writers
20th-century American non-fiction writers
20th-century American male writers